Vodi is a village in Rõuge Parish, Võru County in Estonia.

Before 2017 this village was called Kallaste. Before 2017 this village belonged to Haanja Parish.

References

Villages in Võru County